Xieji is a town in  Shan County in southwestern Shandong province, China, located about  northwest of the county seat. , it has 25 villages under its administration.

See also
List of township-level divisions of Shandong

References

Township-level divisions of Shandong
Heze
Shan County